The Kambari or Kamberi languages) are a cluster of Kainji languages spoken in northwestern Nigeria (Kebbi State and Niger State).

Geographic distribution
The Kambarri languages are spoken in Kebbi and Niger States, Nigeria. There are also some speakers in other parts of Nigeria, including Zamfara State and Abuja.

Languages 
The Kambari languages are:

Kambari I:
 Gadi
 Vadi
 Cishingini
 Tsishingini
 Baangi
 Yumu
Kambari II:
 Tsikimba
 Gaushi
 Wenci

References 

 
Kainji languages